The 1993 Australian motorcycle Grand Prix was the first round of the 1993 Grand Prix motorcycle racing season. It took place on 28 March 1993 at Eastern Creek Raceway.

500 cc race report

Beattie and Chandler get a small gap, then Beattie starts pulling away.

Schwantz, Chandler, Rainey are closing on Beattie. Doohan goes out with a mechanical. Freddie Spencer crashes out hard.

Schwantz arrives and passes into 1st. Rainey, desperate to get to the leaders, brushes Chandler's front tire with his knee as he passes into 2nd, then passes Schwantz for 1st, but cannot hold him off.

500 cc classification

250 cc classification

References

Australian motorcycle Grand Prix
Australian
Motorcycle
Motorsport at Eastern Creek Raceway
March 1993 sports events in Australia